The 2022–23 season was the 61st season in the history of SC Pick Szeged and their 47th consecutive season in the top flight. The club will participate in Nemzeti Bajnokság I, the Magyar Kupa and the EHF Champions League.

Players

Squad information
Squad for the 2022–23 season. 

Goalkeepers
 16  Roland Mikler
 32  Mirko Alilović
Left Wingers
 25  Sebastian Frimmel
 71  Alexander Blonz
Right Wingers
 17  Bogdan Radivojević
 24  Mario Šoštarič
Line players
 22  Matej Gaber
 27  Bence Bánhidi (c)
 45  Miklós Rosta 

Left Backs
9  Richárd Bodó
 21  Zoltán Szita
 51  Borut Mačkovšek
Central Backs
 10  Miguel Martins
 44  Dean Bombač
Right Backs
5  Kent Robin Tønnesen
7  Luka Stepančić 
 41  Imanol Garciandia

Transfers
Source: Rajt a K&H férfi ligában

 IN
 Zoltán Szita (from  Wisła Płock)

 OUT
 Nik Henigman (to  Saint-Raphaël)
 Benjamin Szilágyi (loan to  NEKA)
 Tibor Nagy (loan to  Dabas)
 Bence Vetési (to  Veszprém KKFT)

Staff members
Source: Staff (Szakmai stáb) - Pick Szeged 2022/2023

 Head Coach:  Juan Carlos Pastor
 Assistant Coach:  Marko Krivokapić
 Goalkeeping Coach:  Nenad Damjanović
 Fitness Coach:  Slobodan Acimov
 Club Doctor: István Szabó MD
 Masseur:  Đorđe Ignjatović

Club

Management
Source: Management (Munkatársak)

Uniform
Supplier: Adidas
Shirt sponsor (front): Pick / tippmix / OTP Bank / SMP Solutions
Shirt sponsor (back): Groupama Biztosító / Lexus Szeged 
Shorts sponsor:  Groupama Biztosító / OTP Bank / Lexus Szeged / Hajós Építész Iroda

Pre-season

Friendly matches

Competitions
Times up to 30 October 2022 and from 26 March 2023 are CEST (UTC+2). Times from 30 October 2022 to 26 March 2023 are CET (UTC+1).

Overview

Nemzeti Bajnokság I

Regular season

Results by round

Matches
The league fixtures were announced on 5 July 2022.

Results overview

Magyar Kupa

Szeged entered the tournament in the fifth round.

EHF Champions League

Group stage

The draw was held on 1 July 2022 in Vienna, Austria.

Results overview

Statistics

Top scorers
Includes all competitive matches. The list is sorted by shirt number when total goals are equal. Last updated on 8 September 2022.

Attendances

List of the home matches:

References

External links
 
 Pick Szeged at eurohandball.com

SC Pick Szeged seasons
Pick Szeged